Pedro Daniel García Reátegui (born 16 February 2000) is a Peruvian footballer who plays as a left-back for Peruvian Segunda División side Unión Comercio.

Club career

Sport Boys
García moved from Universidad San Martín to Sport Boys in 2018 and got his official debut for Sports Boys on 11 March 2018 against Deportivo Municipal. He played all 90 minutes in the game which they lost 2–3. García was permanently promoted to Sport Boys' first team in the summer 2018, after arriving to the club six months earlier. However, he only made 3 appearances for the team in the 2018 season. In the 2019 season, he played 17 games in the Peruvian Primera División, most of them from the first minute.

Later clubs
On 29 January 2021, García moved to fellow league club, Alianza Atlético. However he never made any official appearances for the club.

In August 2021, García joined Peruvian Segunda División side Los Chankas. Ahead of the 2023 season, he moved to fellow league club Unión Comercio.

References

External links
 
 

Living people
2000 births
Association football fullbacks
Peruvian footballers
People from Tarapoto
Club Deportivo Universidad de San Martín de Porres players
Sport Boys footballers
Alianza Atlético footballers
Peruvian Primera División players
Peruvian Segunda División players